Jeanne Lafortune is a Canadian economist who currently works as an Full Professor in Economics and Director of Research at the Pontifical Catholic University of Chile. She is also a researcher at the Abdul Latif Jameel Poverty Action Lab (J-PAL LAC), which is a global research center that aims to reduce poverty and improve life quality of people in the Caribbean and Latin America. Lafortune holds a Ph.D. in Economics from the Massachusetts Institute of Technology (MIT), Cambridge, Massachusetts. Her research interests focus on three main fields, including economic history, family and development economics.

Education and work 

Lafortune graduated with a B.A. in Economics (with honors) and Minor in International Development from McGill University in 2002. She then received her M.A. in Economics from the University of Toronto in 2003. She further pursued her studies and earned her Ph.D. in Economics from the Massachusetts Institute of Technology (MIT) in 2008, where she wrote her final dissertation "Essays on Matching, Marriage and Human Capital Accumulation". She also served for the Government of Canada as an economist at the Economic Studies and Policy Analysis Division for the Department of Finance from 2003 to 2004.

Career and research 
Lafortune's research focus revolves around three fields:

 Labor Economics
 Family Economics
 Development Economics

Selected works

Working paper 
“Baby Commodity-Booms? The Impact of Commodity Shocks on Fertility Decisions and Outcomes"

In this research paper, Lafortune collaborates with Francisco Gallego to analyze how economic booms impact fertility rates of families in small, emerging, and open economies. Drawing from previous works on the topic, Lafortune re-evaluates empirical data that suggests a positive relationship between economic prosperity and birth rates and its relationship to family formation variance  while there is limited evidence regarding the relationship between births and worse health outcomes of infants. For instance, the authors found that the birth rate increases during economically prosperous periods, but this is due to the expansion of families formed before the boom rather than the creation of new families during these periods. The opportunity costs faced by women to choose to have or not to have children are influenced by public policy. Additionally, the opportunity costs are different among women starting a family and women having more children, a present gap in previous literature. For example, for first-time mothers, an improvement in economic opportunities might reduce their desire to have a child since it interrupts their work life, however women who already have a child are less likely to be working and appear to be in favour of expanding their existing family during better economic conditions. In the future, Lafortune and Gallego suggest research to focus on the impact of fatherhood on their assessments.

Publication 
"Marry for What?  Caste and Mate Selection in Modern India"

Lafortune writes this paper in collaboration with economists Abhijit Banerjee, Esther Duflo and Maitreesh Ghatak for the American Economic Journal. The study focuses on the influence caste systems have on marriage decisions among men and women in India, over economic differentials. This question is relevant since it accounts for “status”-like attributes (caste) that are missing in the literature of marriage economics, suggesting that economic reasons are the main influence regarding marriage choices in India and other developing countries. Lafortune and her colleagues found that caste is highly valued by Indians who are looking to get married. Yet, data suggests that this trend might be changing in the future as 30 percent of people in the sample married outside their caste (a trade-off between caste and higher economic status, education, and/or beauty). Control variables include age, education, wage, location, family origins, and height. Additionally, the next generation of the respondents will eventually marry through a channel of friends and family networks instead of ads. The authors conclude that caste preference has not been undermined by economic forces, but the changing trends on these preferences should be analyzed further.

Research publications 

 Lafortune, J. (2013). Making yourself attractive: Pre-marital investments and the returns to education in the marriage market. American Economic Journal: Applied Economics, 5(2), 151–178.
 Banerjee, A., Duflo, E., Ghatak, M., & Lafortune, J. (2013). Marry for what? caste and mate selection in modern india. American Economic Journal: Microeconomics, 5(2), 33–72.
 Gross, T., Lafortune, J., & Low, C. (2014). What happens the morning after? the costs and benefits of expanding access to emergency contraception. Journal of Policy Analysis and Management, 33(1), 70–93.
 Lafortune, J., & Lee, S. (2014). All for one?: Family size and children's educational distribution under credit constraints. The American Economic Review, 104(5), 365–369.
 Covarrubias, M., Lafortune, J., & Tessada, J. (2015). Who comes and why? determinants of immigrants skill level in the early xxth century us. Journal of Demographic Economics, 81(1), 115–155.
 Lafortune, J., Tessada, J., & González-Velosa, C. (2015). More hands, more power? estimating the impact of immigration on output and technology choices using early 20th century US agriculture. Journal of International Economics, 97(2), 339–358.
 Lafortune, J., & Low, C. (2017). Tying the double-knot: The role of assets in marriage commitment. American Economic Review, 107(5), 163–167. doi:10.1257/aer.p20171058
 Chiappori, P., Iyigun, M., Lafortune, J., & Weiss, Y. (2017). Changing the rules midway: The impact of granting alimony rights on existing and newly formed partnerships. The Economic Journal, 127(604), 1874–1905.
 Lafortune, J., Lewis, E., & Tessada, J. (2019). People and machines: A look at the evolving relationship between capital and skill in manufacturing, 1860–1930, using immigration shocks. The Review of Economics and Statistics, 101(1), 30–43.

Teaching 
Lafortune started as an assistant professor at the University of Maryland College of Behavioral and Social Sciences in the U.S. from 2008 to 2012. She worked in the Department of Economics at the Pontifical Catholic University of Chile (UC) as an assistant professor from 2010 to 2015, where she later became Associate Professor in 2015. Along her teaching experience, she has taught economics courses at both undergraduate and graduate level.

On May 27th, 2022, she was promoted to full professorship of Economics at UC in Chile. 

 At the University of Maryland:

 At the Pontifical Catholic University of Chile (UC):

Grants and awards

Affiliations 
 Abdul Latif Jameel Poverty Action Lab
Facultad de Ciencias Económicas y Administrativas de la Pontificia Universidad Católica de Chile
Institute of Labor Economics (IZA)

References 

Living people
Year of birth missing (living people)
MIT School of Humanities, Arts, and Social Sciences alumni
Academic staff of the Pontifical Catholic University of Chile
Canadian women economists
McGill University alumni